Snap is a web development framework written in the Haskell programming language.

Overview 
The Snap framework comprises:
 snap-core, a generic Haskell web server API.
 snap-server, a fast HTTP server that implements the snap-core interface.
 Heist, an HTML-based templating system for generating pages that allows you to bind Haskell functionality to HTML tags for a clean separation of view and backend code, much like Lift's snippets. Heist is completely self-contained and can be used independently.
 Snaplets, a high-level system for building modular web applications.
 Built-in snaplets for templating, session management, and authentication.
 Third party snaplets for features such as file uploads, database connectivity (PostgreSQL, MongoDB, etc.), generation of JavaScript from Haskell code, and more.
 The Snap monad for stateful access to HTTP requests and responses.

Snap runs on both Windows NT and Unix-like platforms.  Snap uses the Iteratee I/O model,  As of version 1.0, its i/o is implemented with io-streams.

Usage
It is used by Silk, JanRain, Racemetric, www.lpaste.net, SooStone Inc, and Group Commerce. Snap is also used as a lightweight, standalone Haskell server. The static site generator Hakyll uses Snap for its preview mode.

Other Haskell web frameworks 
 Yesod (web framework)
 Scotty
 Spock
 MFlow
 Miso

References

External links 
 Snap framework

Haskell software
Free software programmed in Haskell
Web frameworks
Software using the BSD license